Maurizio Turone (born 27 October 1948 in Varazze) is a retired Italian professional footballer, who played as a defender, usually as a sweeper.

Career
He played for 10 seasons (227 games, 4 goals) in the Serie A for A.C. Milan, F.C. Catanzaro and A.S. Roma.

He is most famous for the so-called Turone's goal. The goal he scored in a crucial league game against league-leading Juventus F.C. for second-placed A.S. Roma was disallowed as the linesman ruled he was offside. The game ended 0–0 and Juventus eventually clinched the title.

The TV images never clarified, in a definitive way, if the player's position was irregular or not. In the following years, conflicting opinions, projections with new technologies and alleged manipulation of slow motion continued to come in succession; in any case, from then on, the "Turone's goal" remained a hot topic in Italian football for decades to come.

Honours

Club
Milan
 Coppa Italia winner: 1972–73, 1976–77.
 UEFA Cup Winners' Cup winner: 1972–73.

Roma
 Coppa Italia winner: 1979–80, 1980–81.

References

External links
 Profile at magliarossonera.it 

1948 births
Living people
Italian footballers
Serie A players
Serie B players
Serie C players
Genoa C.F.C. players
A.C. Milan players
U.S. Catanzaro 1929 players
A.S. Roma players
Bologna F.C. 1909 players
Savona F.B.C. players
Association football defenders